The Eurovision Song Contest 2017 was the 62nd edition of the Eurovision Song Contest.
Organised by the European Broadcasting Union (EBU) and host broadcaster Public Broadcasting Company of Ukraine (UA:PBC), the contest was held at the International Exhibition Centre and consisted of two semi-finals on 9 and 11 May, and a final on 13 May 2017. The three live shows were presented by Ukrainian television presenters Oleksandr Skichko, Volodymyr Ostapchuk and Timur Miroshnychenko, being the first contest since the inaugural  edition without a female host.

Forty-two countries participated in the contest.  and  returned to the contest after a year's absence, while  did not participate on financial grounds.  had originally planned to participate, but later withdrew after its representative, Julia Samoylova, was banned from entering Ukraine by virtue of having travelled directly from Russia to Crimea, a region that was annexed by Russia in 2014, to give a performance, which is illegal under Ukrainian law.

This was Portugal's first victory in the contest – and first top-five placing – in 53 years of participation, the longest winless run by a country in Eurovision history. Bulgaria, Moldova, Belgium and Sweden rounded out the top five. The top three countries – Portugal, Bulgaria and Moldova – all achieved their highest placings in their Eurovision history, while host country Ukraine received its worst placing to date, finishing 24th in the final. Out of the "Big Five" countries, only Italy, the pre-contest favourite, finished in the top ten, coming in sixth place.

The EBU reported that 182 million viewers worldwide watched the contest, 22 million fewer than the 2016 record.

Location

Venue
The contest took place in the International Exhibition Centre in Kyiv, following Ukraine's victory at the 2016 contest with the song "1944", written and performed by Jamala. The International Exhibition Centre has a capacity of approximately 11,000 attendees and is the largest exhibition centre in Kyiv. Located in the western part of the Livoberezhna microdistrict, the centre was opened in October 2002, and its head since its construction was Anatoly Tkachenko.

Bidding phase

The Deputy Chief of host broadcaster Public Broadcasting Company of Ukraine (UA:PBC) and Head of Delegation for Ukraine, Viktoria Romanova, stated on 18 May 2016 that the first organisational meeting for the contest would take place before 8 June, during which the European Broadcasting Union (EBU) and UA:PBC would go through the technical requirements for the contest, as well as any training required for the contest to take place in Ukraine. Romanova also announced that the venue for the contest would be announced over the summer.

UA:PBC and the Ukrainian Government formally launched the bidding process for interested cities to apply to host the contest on 23 June. The selection of the host city was scheduled to be conducted in four stages:
24 June – 8 July: Interested cities were formally invited to submit their bids.
8–15 July: A working group within UA:PBC and a government-appointed Local Organisational Committee (LOC) headed by Ukrainian Prime Minister Volodymyr Groysman reviewed submitted bids prior to their formal presentation.
18–22 July: Candidate cities formally presented their bids to the LOC. The bids of three cities were shortlisted and handed over to the EBU.
22 July – 1 August: The three shortlisted cities were inspected by representatives from the EBU and LOC to explore their infrastructure and implementation of their bids. A press conference was initially planned to be held during this period to announce the selection results and the host city.

The following criteria were outlined for the selection of the host city:
The venue must be covered with a capacity of at least 7,000 but ideally up to 10,000 attendees.
An international press centre must be able to accommodate no less than 1,550 journalists.
Venues must also be provided for the opening and closing ceremonies of at least 3,000 attendees.
The host city must have fairly priced hotel rooms to European standards, that are located in close proximity to the venue and the city centre. At least 2,000 hotel rooms must be provided: 1,000 for participating delegations and 1,000 for accredited media and fans.
The host city must be able to guarantee the safety and security of participants, members of delegations and guests.
The host city must have modern transport infrastructure: an international airport and readily available transport between the airport, the city and hotels, in addition to convenient traffic in the city and the opportunity to provide additional transport routes.
The host city must provide a social program alongside their bid, showcasing the hospitality, originality, cultural values and identity of both the city and Ukraine.

Six cities submitted applications by the deadline of 8 July: Dnipro, Kharkiv, Kherson, Kyiv, Lviv and Odessa. Prior to the opening of the bidding process, the cities of Cherkasy, Irpin, Uzhhorod and Vinnytsia had declared their interest in hosting the contest, but did not submit a formal bid. Ukrainian Culture Minister Yevhen Nyshchuk stated on 30 June that an appropriate venue for the contest does not exist in Ukraine, suggesting that the construction of a new venue in Kyiv or Lviv should be considered.

The six candidate cities were officially presented to the LOC on 20 July in a two-hour live discussion show titled City Battle, broadcast from the UA:Pershyi studios in Kyiv and moderated by Timur Miroshnychenko, with radio commentary from Olena Zelinchenko. The show was broadcast on UA:Pershyi, Radio Ukraine and the UA:Pershyi YouTube channel with commentary in English and Ukrainian. During the show, a representative from each candidate city presented its bid in front of a live studio audience:

Dnipro: Borys Filatov (City Mayor)
Kharkiv: Ihor Terekhov (Deputy City Mayor)
Kherson: Volodymyr Mykolaienko (City Mayor)
Kyiv: Oleksii Reznikov (Deputy Head of City State Administration)
Lviv: Andrii Moskalenko (Deputy City Mayor)
Odessa: Pavlo Vugelman (Deputy City Mayor)

Members of the LOC, media representatives, Ukrainian musical experts and fans also participated in the discussion.

Host selection
UA:PBC announced on 22 July that the bids from Dnipro, Kyiv and Odessa had been shortlisted for further consideration.

The EBU announced on 30 July that the host city would be announced "in due course", rather than on the previously stated date of 1 August, with Executive Supervisor of the contest Jon Ola Sand stating that the EBU "really want to take the time it takes to come up with the right decision". The Deputy General Director of UA:PBC, Oleksandr Kharebin, stated on 10 August that the host city would be announced on Ukrainian Independence Day, 24 August. The announcement was later scheduled to take place on 25 August; however, it was postponed at 14:00 EEST, one hour before it was due to take place, with NTU citing the need to further consider some fine details regarding the decision.

After several delays in announcing the host city, UA:PBC announced on 8 September that they would be meeting with the Ukrainian Government and the LOC on 9 September and that a press conference to announce the host city was scheduled to take place at 13:00 EEST on the same day from the Government Press Centre in Kyiv. Kyiv was announced as the host city for the contest with the International Exhibition Centre selected as the venue.

Key

 Host venue
 Shortlisted

Other sites

The Eurovision Village was the official Eurovision Song Contest fan and sponsors' area during the events week. There it was possible to watch performances by local artists, as well as the live shows broadcast from the main venue. Located at Independence Square in Kyiv, it was open from 4 to 14 May 2017.

The EuroClub was the venue for the official after-parties and private performances by contest participants. Unlike the Eurovision Village, access to the EuroClub was restricted to accredited fans, delegates, and press. It was located at the Parkovy Congress and Exhibition Center.

The "Red Carpet" event, where the contestants and their delegations are presented before the accredited press and fans, took place at Mariinskyi Palace in central Kyiv on 7 May 2017 at 19:00 CEST, followed by the Opening Ceremony at the Parkovy Congress and Exhibition Center.

Format

The preliminary dates for the contest were announced on 14 March 2016 at a meeting of Heads of Delegation in Stockholm, with the semi-finals expected to take place on 16 and 18 May and the final on 20 May 2017. These preliminary dates were chosen by the EBU to avoid the contest coinciding with any major television and sporting events scheduled to take place around that time.

However, the EBU announced on 24 June that the preliminary dates for the contest had to be brought forward a week, with the semi-finals scheduled for 9 and 11 May and the final on 13 May. This was due to a request from UA:PBC, as the initial preliminary dates coincided with the Remembrance Day for the victims of the Deportation of the Crimean Tatars on 18 May. However, the current dates coincide with the second leg of the UEFA Champions League and UEFA Europa League semi-finals.

Semi-final allocation draw
The draw to determine the allocation of the participating countries into their respective semi-finals took place at Column Hall on 31 January 2017, hosted by Timur Miroshnychenko and Nika Konstantinova. The thirty-seven semi-finalists had been allocated into six pots, based on historical voting patterns as calculated by the contest's official televoting partner Digame. Drawing from different pots helps to reduce the chance of so-called "bloc voting" and increase suspense in the semi-finals.

Visual design 
The theme of the contest, "Celebrate Diversity", was unveiled on 30 January 2017, with its visual design featuring imagery of stylized beads. The main logo used the beads to form a traditional Ukrainian neck amulet.

Presenters
The EBU announced on 27 February that the presenters for the contest would be Oleksandr Skichko, Volodymyr Ostapchuk and Timur Miroshnychenko, with Miroshnychenko also hosting the green room. It was the first time that the contest was presented by a male trio, and the second time that the contest did not feature a female presenter, after 1956.

Promotional emojis

It was announced on 30 April that the creative teams from both the Eurovision network and Twitter had worked together to create three emoji that would accompany specific promotional hashtags for the duration of the contest. The heart emoji would appear alongside #ESC2017 and #Eurovision, while the winners' trophy emoji would be used for #12Points and #douzepoints. The final emoji is the logo for the contest, which would appear alongside #CelebrateDiversity, the slogan of the contest.

Opening and interval acts
The EBU released details regarding the opening and interval acts for each of the live shows on 20 April. The first semi-final was opened by Monatik performing "Spinning", while the interval featured Jamala performing a new version of her winning song "1944" and "Zamanyly". The second semi-final was opened by a medley of past Eurovision songs performed by co-presenters Oleksandr Skichko and Volodymyr Ostapchuk, while the interval featured a dance performance by Apache Crew titled "The Children's Courtyard". In the interval of the final, Jamala performed her new single "I Believe in U", and Onuka performed a megamix together with Ukraine's National Academic Orchestra of Folk Instruments.

Participating countries

This subsequently reduced the number of participating countries to forty-two, the same number of countries as 2016.

Returning artists
The contest featured five representatives who also previously performed as lead vocalists for the same countries. Omar Naber represented Slovenia in 2005, finishing 12th in the semi-final with the song "Stop". This also made for one of the only occasions in which the same participants not only returned after originally competing in the same year, but also had both participations occur in the same host country (the only other recent example being 1982, which saw both Norway's Anita Skorgan and Belgium's Stella Maessen return to the United Kingdom for the second time after the 1977 contest). SunStroke Project represented Moldova in  alongside Olia Tira, finishing 22nd with the song "Run Away".

The contest also featured the group OG3NE which previously represented the Netherlands at another Eurovision event, the Junior Eurovision Song Contest 2007, as Lisa, Amy and Shelley, with the song "Adem in, adem uit".

Semi-final 1
Eighteen countries participated in the first semi-final. ,  and  voted in this semi-final. The highlighted countries qualified for the final.

Semi-final 2
Eighteen countries participated in the second semi-final. ,  and  voted in this semi-final.  was originally planned to perform in position three, but withdrew from the contest after the artist they selected was banned from entering Ukraine, resulting in countries originally planned to perform fourth and later, to do so one place earlier. The highlighted countries qualified for the final.

Final
Twenty-six countries participated in the final, with all 42 participating countries eligible to vote. The running order for the final was revealed after the second semi-final qualifiers' press conference on 11 May.

Detailed voting results

Semi-final 1

12 points 
Below is a summary of the maximum 12 points awarded by each country's professional jury and televote in the first semi-final. Countries in bold gave the maximum 24 points (12 points apiece from professional jury and televoting) to the specified entrant.

Semi-final 2

12 points 
Below is a summary of the maximum 12 points awarded by each country's professional jury and televote in the second semi-final. Countries in bold gave the maximum 24 points (12 points apiece from professional jury and televoting) to the specified entrant.

Final

12 points 
Below is a summary of the maximum 12 points awarded by each country's professional jury and televote in the final. Countries in bold gave the maximum 24 points (12 points apiece from professional jury and televoting) to the specified entrant.

Spokespersons 
The spokespersons announced the 12-point score from their respective country's national jury in the following order:

 Wiktoria
 Tural Asadov
 Lia Fiorio 
 Aminata
 
 Tijana Mišković
 Andri Xhahu
 Martha Fenech
 Ilija Grujoski
 Ulla Essendrop
 Kristina Inhof
 Marcus & Martinus
 Nieves Álvarez
 Jenni Vartiainen
 Élodie Gossuin
 Constantinos Christoforou
 Eglė Daugėlaitė
 Jüri Pootsmann
 Gloria Gorceag
 Iveta Mukuchyan
 
 Bo Halldórsson
 Sanja Vučić
 Lee Lin Chin
 Giulia Valentina Palermo
 Barbara Schöneberger
 Filomena Cautela
 Luca Hänni
 Douwe Bob
 Nicky Byrne
 Nika Kocharov
 Giannis Karagiannis
 Alyona Lanskaya
 Sonia Argint-Ionescu
 Csilla Tatár
 Katarina Čas
 
 
 Katrina Leskanich
 Uršula Tolj
 
 Zlata Ognevich

Other countries

Eligibility for potential participation in the Eurovision Song Contest requires a national broadcaster with active EBU membership that would be able to broadcast the contest via the Eurovision network. The EBU issued an invitation to participate in the contest to all active members and associate member Australia.

Active EBU members
 – Ràdio i Televisió d'Andorra (RTVA) announced on 19 May 2016 that Andorra would not participate in the contest.
 – Radio and Television of Bosnia and Herzegovina (BHRT) announced on 28 September 2016 that Bosnia and Herzegovina would not participate in the contest due to their inability to secure stable funding and sponsorship for participation. BHRT was also suffering from financial difficulties due to insufficient legislation that would ensure its continued operation. The EBU had threatened to withdraw BHRT from all member services in May 2016, due to non-payment of debts totalling 6 million Swiss francs (€5.4 million). Recent news sources have revealed that the EBU have now begun to impose sanctions on BHRT as a result of outstanding debts.
 – While RTL Télé Lëtzebuerg (RTL) announced on 25 May 2016 that they would not participate in the contest, the Petitions Committee of the Luxembourgish Government announced on 21 June that they had received a petition calling on RTL to return to the contest. The Luxembourgish Government have decided to debate the proposals set out in the petition, and the possibility of Luxembourg returning to the contest in future. RTL reiterated its intention not to participate on 22 August.
 – Télé Monte Carlo (TMC) announced on 19 August 2016 that Monaco would not participate in the contest.
 – Russia had originally planned to participate in the contest with the song "Flame Is Burning", performed by Julia Samoylova. However, Channel One Russia withdrew from the contest on 13 April 2017, after Samoylova was issued a three-year travel ban by the Security Service of Ukraine (SBU) from entering Ukraine on 22 March, by virtue of illegally travelling directly from Russia to Crimea, a region that was annexed by Russia in 2014, in 2015 to give a performance.
 – Radio and Television Slovakia (RTVS) explained on 12 April 2016 that Slovakia's absence from the contest since 2012 was due to the "cost involved in participation". RTVS' PR manager, Juraj Kadáš, stated that while participating in the contest is an attractive project, RTVS has a programming strategy that gives priority to financing domestic television production. RTVS announced on 6 September that they have yet to make a decision, but announced on 24 October that they would not participate in the contest.
 – Despite speculation surrounding their participation, the Turkish Radio and Television Corporation (TRT) issued a written statement to the EBU on 12 May 2016 stating their participation in the contest. Turkey withdrew after last participating in 2012, due to their discontent at the introduction of a mixed voting system to the contest and the automatic qualification of the Big Five for the final. Turkish media reported on 28 September that a decision would be made in early October, with various news sources reporting that several non-governmental organizations were cooperating to persuade TRT to return to the contest in 2017. However, it was reported on 23 October that the Director General of NTU, Zurab Alaskan Ia, had stated that TRT had refused an invitation of participation. This information was confirmed on 24 October.

Associate EBU members
 – Khabar Agency became an associate member of the EBU on 1 January 2016, opening up the possibility of a future participation. However, the EBU announced on 28 September that while Khabar Agency were unable to debut in the 2016 contest because they did not have active membership, they are reviewing the rules for the 2017 contest, which may include opening up the possibility of Khabar Agency making its début in the contest. However, Kazakhstan was not on the final list of participating countries announced by the EBU on 31 October 2016.

Non-EBU members
 – Albanian news portal Koha reported on 6 April 2016 that the Director General of Radio Television of Kosovo (RTK), Mentor Shala, had announced at a press conference that Kosovo, had been invited to participate, with a decision on whether or not to pursue the invitation to be made later in 2016. However, this was confirmed to be untrue, after Shala stated on 7 April that his comments were misinterpreted by Koha, and what he actually meant was that "RTK was invited to [the] Eurovision Committee and Kosovo’s acceptance or not in the Eurovision depends on them". This was backed up by a statement from the EBU.

 – While 1 Fürstentum Liechtenstein Television (1FLTV) announced on 21 September 2016 that they would not be making their début at the contest, 1FLTV also stated their intention to debut in a future contest, on receipt of financial support from the Liechtenstein Government towards active EBU membership and the costs associated with a potential participation.

Broadcasts 

Most countries sent commentators to Kyiv or commentated from their own country, in order to add insight to the participants and, if necessary, the provision of voting information. The EBU announced on 9 May, that all three shows would also be streamed live via YouTube.

It was reported by the EBU that the contest was viewed by a worldwide television audience of approximately 182 million viewers, which was 22 million less than the 2016 record which was viewed by 204 million. The EBU stated that this decrease in viewing figures was likely a result of the withdrawal of Russia and its decision not to broadcast any of the three shows.

Incidents

Organising team shakeup
In December 2016, Grytsak was appointed as a new head of the organising committee. In February 2017, 21 team members resigned claiming that the new appointment effectively stopped the work for two months.

French song submission
France 2 announced on 9 February 2017 that they would participate at the contest with the song "", performed by Alma. However, it was discovered during the week of 17 February that "Requiem" had been recorded and performed prior to 1 September 2016, the submission deadline set by the EBU, potentially violating the rules of the contest. Further investigation revealed that "Requiem" had been performed at the end of January 2015. While France 2 had claimed not to be in breach of the rules of the contest, no ultimate decision had been made regarding their potential disqualification. No further reports were made regarding Alma's participation, and she was able to partake in the competition in May with a revised version of the song.

Russian withdrawal

Channel One Russia (C1R) announced on 12 March 2017 that they would participate at the contest with "Flame Is Burning", performed by Julia Samoylova. However, Samoylova was issued a three-year travel ban on entering Ukraine by the Security Service of Ukraine (SBU) on 22 March, by virtue of illegally travelling directly from Russia to Crimea, a region that was annexed by Russia in 2014, in 2015 to give a performance. Entry to Crimea by non-Ukrainian citizens via Russia is illegal under Ukrainian law; however, Samoylova confirmed that she performed in Crimea in 2015.

The EBU responded by stating its commitment to ensuring that all participating countries would be able to perform in Kyiv, while expressing their disappointment at the lack of compromise from C1R and UA:PBC. C1R were offered the opportunity to allow Samoylova to perform via satellite from a venue of their choice, but such a compromise was rejected by both C1R and the Ukrainian Government.

The Director General of the EBU, Ingrid Deltenre, condemned Ukraine's actions, describing them as "abusing the contest for political reasons" and "absolutely unacceptable" C1R announced their withdrawal from the contest on 13 April, stating that they also might not broadcast the contest. C1R had not organised accommodation before their artist announcement, as is typically the case, and refused to attend the meeting of Heads of Delegation. By announcing their artist just before the deadline for entry submission to the contest and not booking a hotel, it was speculated that C1R had not intended to go due to audiences booing Russian artists in previous contests.

As part of the Russian Victory Day celebrations on 9 May, Samoylova gave another performance in Crimea, including "Flame Is Burning", the song which was intended to represent Russia at the contest.

Israeli broadcaster compromise
Under a proposal by Israeli Prime Minister Benjamin Netanyahu and Finance Minister Moshe Kahlon, the Israeli Broadcasting Authority (IBA) was reorganised into two separate entities: the Israeli Public Broadcasting Corporation (IPBC), with responsibility for "general programming" such as entertainment, and another with responsibility for news and current affairs programming. The IPBC is also branded as Kan. The EBU informed the IPBC executive board on 7 April that such a compromise would render them unable to remain a member without an outlet for news and current events programming. It was then reported that the IBA may cease to be a member of the EBU.

The IBA was expected to close down on 15 May 2017, before the IPBC was expected to launch. However, on 9 and 10 May 2017, the IBA unexpectedly closed down most of their operations in news and current affair programs. The 2017 contest was the last program that Channel 1 aired under the IBA, where a skeleton staff of twenty people remained to ensure a smooth transmission of the shows on Channel 1. After the contest ended, the station displayed a slide about its closure. During the jury voting segment of the final, Ofer Nachshon, the Israeli voting spokesperson since 2009, bid farewell on behalf of the IBA before revealing their jury points. This was incorrectly reported by several international media outlets as Israel leaving the contest.

The IPBC applied for EBU membership later that year and was accepted, thus Israel continued to participate. However, the EBU warned that the pending plan to make the IPBC's news department a separate entity conflicted with rules requiring member broadcasters to handle both news and entertainment programming. As a high-court decision on the split approached, Netanyahu stated that the Israeli government would comply with EBU rules to protect its hosting rights for the 2019 edition. The High Court of Justice later issued a temporary injunction, blocking the split. The split was eventually cancelled permanently, allowing the IPBC to meet all requirements for joining the EBU.

Argument for using pre-recorded vocals live
Norsk rikskringkasting (NRK) had discussions with the EBU regarding the abolition of the rule prohibiting pre-recorded vocals during live performances at the contest. Such a rule is intended to guarantee the authenticity of live performances. The discussion stems from when Norwegian representative Jowst stated his displeasure at the rule in an interview on 24 March, in reference to the sampling technique of chopped vocals in his song "Grab the Moment" which cannot be attributed in the live performance.

Such objections led the EBU to consider deducting a third of Croatia's final score, reducing it from 118 points to 79. However, such a deduction never occurred. The possible abolition of the rule, alongside the abolition of the live orchestra in 1999, has led some fans and critics of the contest to argue that the contest has become too commercialised and the authenticity of live performances has been compromised.

After discussing the matter with the EBU, NRK were granted an exception to the rule. Jowst stated that "[the Norwegian delegation] have now been allowed to use the recorded vocal tracks, [...]. But [they] have also practiced a plan B with the backing vocalists, if there are big protests from others in Kyiv." Both Jowst and Aleksander Walmann think that had "Grab the Moment" been in the semi-final of the 2018 contest following an abolition of the rule, they would have had an advantage. NRK stated on 2 May that Jowst was aiming to perform the song acoustically as a back-up, by bringing two additional backing vocalists who would perform the pre-recorded vocals live using a filter applied by the sound engineering team so as not to compromise on sound quality.

Norwegian jury replacement
Norwegian jury member Per Sundnes made comments on NRK preview show Adresse Kiev on 17 April 2017 against Irish representative Brendan Murray, saying: "It's been a long time since they've gotten up and I do not think they'll do it again. They try the same formula year after year." The comments were not welcomed by the Irish delegation, who subsequently reported the matter to the EBU.

The Irish Independent reported on 8 May that Sundnes had been replaced due to an alleged breach in jury rules. Commenting on the decision, the Head of Delegation for Ireland, Michael Kealy, said: "I'm glad that the European Broadcasting Union have reacted swiftly to this situation and that all jury members are impartial. It's only fair that each song in the Eurovision Song Contest is judged on its individual merits on the night." Sundnes was subsequently replaced by Erland Bakke.

Sundnes stated in an interview with Verdens Gang on 9 May: "I do not know anything about the jury stuff, just that I'm not [in it]. It was not really surprising. The same thing happened in Sweden last year with the Swedish professional jury."

NRK admits that they made a mistake by letting Sundnes sit in both the professional jury and the judging panel of Adresse Kiev. However, when they were informed by the EBU that this was against the rules, they rectified the situation quickly. Project manager for Melodi Grand Prix and Norwegian Head of Delegation, Stig Karlsen, stated: "We have received some concerns from several teams that Per has been in the jury, while at the same time he has been meaningful in the program. Therefore, we took a new assessment."

Estonian technical issues 
On 11 May 2017, during the transmission of the second semi-final, the microphone of the Estonian representative seemed to have malfunctioned as singer Laura Põldvere could not be heard for approximately two seconds by viewers at home. It was later revealed that the Estonian delegation considered appealing to the EBU to allow Põldvere and Koit Toome to perform their entry "Verona" again as a result of the error, but later decided against it. Mart Normet, the Head of Delegation for Estonia, explained "If there has been such a powerful performance for three minutes and given an absolute maximum, then this energy again does not come back when you go on stage again". The EBU responded to the situation, reportedly describing the error as purely technical, as the microphone was supposed to automatically come on. Instead, a sound technician was forced to respond by manually switching on the microphone via the sound desk. The country ultimately failed to reach the grand final, with Põldvere expressing her annoyance, however stating "I do not think it’s so tremendously influenced when a few words remain unheard".

Salvador Sobral's political message 

The Portuguese representative Salvador Sobral drew attention to the European migrant crisis by turning up to the first semi-final winners' press conference in an "S.O.S. Refugees" shirt. "If I'm here and I have European exposure, the least thing I can do is a humanitarian message", Sobral stated. "People come to Europe in plastic boats and are being asked to show their birth certificates in order to enter a country. These people are not immigrants, they're refugees running from death. Make no mistake. There is so much bureaucratic stuff happening in the refugee camps in Greece, Turkey and Italy and we should help create legal and safe pathways from these countries to their destiny countries", he added, earning a round of applause. Later on, the EBU ordered a ban so that he could not wear it for the remainder of the contest. The EBU explained that Sobral's jumper was used as a means of "political message," which violates the rules of the contest. However, Sobral argued in his winning press conference that it was not political, but a message of humanitarianism.

Jamala stage invasion 
Jamala's performance of her song "I Believe in U" during the interval of the final was disrupted by a man draped in an Australian flag who invaded the stage and briefly mooned the audience before being removed by security. He was later identified as Ukrainian prankster Vitalii Sediuk. In their response to the incident, the EBU stated the following: "A person took to the stage at the beginning of Jamala's performance of 'I Believe in U' at tonight's Eurovision Song Contest in Kyiv. He was quickly removed from the stage by security and out of the arena. He is currently being held and questioned by the police at the venue police office." The last time an unauthorised person gained access to the stage was in 2010 when the Spanish performance was disrupted by Jimmy Jump.

Other awards 
In addition to the main winner's trophy, the Marcel Bezençon Awards and the Barbara Dex Award were contested during the 2017 Eurovision Song Contest. The OGAE, "General Organisation of Eurovision Fans" voting poll also took place before the contest.

Marcel Bezençon Awards 
The Marcel Bezençon Awards, organised since 2002 by Sweden's then-Head of Delegation and 1992 representative Christer Björkman, and 1984 winner Richard Herrey, honours songs in the contest's final. The awards are divided into three categories: Artistic Award, Composers Award, and Press Award. The winners were revealed shortly before the final on 13 May.

OGAE 

OGAE, an organisation of over forty Eurovision Song Contest fan clubs across Europe and beyond, conducts an annual voting poll first held in 2002 as the Marcel Bezençon Fan Award. The 2017 poll ran from 1 to 30 April with a daily-publishing of adding the votes of 44 clubs, and after all votes were cast, the top-ranked entry was Italy's "" performed by Francesco Gabbani; the top five results are shown below.

Barbara Dex Award 
The Barbara Dex Award is a humorous fan award given to the worst dressed artist each year. Named after Belgium's representative who came last in the 1993 contest, wearing her self-designed dress, the award was handed for the first year by the fansite songfestival.be after the fansite House of Eurovision organised it from 1997 to 2016.

Official album 

Eurovision Song Contest: Kyiv 2017 is the official compilation album of the contest, put together by the European Broadcasting Union and was released by Universal Music Group digitally on 21 April and physically on 28 April 2017. The album features all 42 participating entries, including the semi-finalists that failed to qualify for the final. The album also features the Russian entry which withdrew from the contest on 13 April 2017. This is the second consecutive year that the official album featured a song which had withdrawn before the contest.

Charts

See also
ABU International Dance Festival 2017
Bala Turkvision Song Contest 2017
Eurovision Choir of the Year 2017
Eurovision Young Dancers 2017
Junior Eurovision Song Contest 2017
Turkvision Song Contest 2017

Notes

References

External links
 
 
 

 
2017
Music festivals in Ukraine
2010s in Kyiv
2017 in Ukraine
2017 song contests
Music in Kyiv
Events in Kyiv
May 2017 events in Europe